"Lying" is a song by American country pop duo Dan + Shay. It was released as a promotional single from their fourth studio album, Good Things, on July 29, 2021. The song was solely produced by duo-member Dan Smyers. It interpolates late American singer-songwriter Bill Withers' 1972 single, "Lean on Me", therefore, he is credited as a songwriter.

Background and composition
On July 27, 2021, Dan + Shay announced the song and its release date along with a teaser video. On the song's chorus, they sing the lines, "I don't miss you in my bed / I don't hear you in my head / I don't love you / I'm not cryin' / And I swear, I'm not lyin'" and "the verses double down on the message that this song's narrator is all the way over his ex". Angela Stefano of Taste of Country felt that "all their bombtastic professions might leave you feeling a bit dubious" after listened to more closely. The song contains a "jazzy piano-driven tune".

Music video
The official music video premiered alongside the song on July 29, 2021. It is directed by Dani Vitale and Patrick Tracey. Dan + Shay start off performing the song inside of a dive bar. Later, they go outside to the audience and then perform a choreographed dance. On the same day the song and music video were released, Dan + Shay commentated their opinions on social media, stating that "this is the most fun we've ever had making a music video" and also announced a dance challenge that emulates the dance that was performed in the visuals.

Credits and personnel
Credits adapted from Tidal.

Dan + Shay

 Dan Smyers – vocals, production, songwriting, programming
 Shay Mooney – vocals, songwriting

Other musicians and technical

 Andy Albert – songwriting
 Bill Withers – songwriting
 Jordan Reynolds – songwriting, programming
 Bryan Sutton – acoustic guitar, mandolin, dobro
 Derek Wells – electric guitar
 Jimmie Lee Sloas – bass guitar
 Nir Z – drums, percussion
 Gordon Mote – piano, Hammond B-3 organ
 Ryan Yount – assistant engineering
 Jeff Juliano – mixing
 Dave Cook – assistant mixing
 Eric Kirkland – assistant mixing
 Andrew Mendelson – mastering
 Jeff Balding – recording

References

2021 singles
2021 songs
Dan + Shay songs
Songs written by Dan Smyers
Songs written by Shay Mooney
Songs written by Bill Withers
Songs written by Andy Albert
Warner Records Nashville singles